The Fiend or The Vampire (Russian: Упырь Upyr) is a Russian fairy tale, collected by Alexander Afanasyev as his number 363. The tale was translated and published by William Ralston Shedden-Ralston.

Plot synopsis
A young woman named Marusia goes to a feast where she meets a kind, handsome and apparently wealthy man. They fall in love with each other and Marusia agrees to marry him. She also consents to her mother's directive that she follow the boy to discover where he lives and more about him. She follows him to the church where she sees him eating a corpse. Later the fiend asks her if she saw him at the church. When Marusia denies having followed him, he tells her that her father will die the next day. Thereafter, he continually poses the question and with each denial he causes another of her family members to die. Finally he tells her that she herself will die. At this point Marusia asks her grandmother what to do. Her grandmother explains a way by which Marusia can come back to life after she dies (a condition of which is that she cannot enter a church afterwards). On coming back to life she meets a good man whom she marries, however he does not like the fact that she will not go to church and eventually forces her to do so. Thus the Fiend discovers that she is alive and kills her husband and her son, but with the help of her grandmother, the water of life, and holy water she brings them back and kills the fiend.

Analysis

Tale type 
The tale is classified in the Aarne-Thompson-Uther Index as tale type ATU 363, "The Vampire" or "The Corpse-Eater", while in the East Slavic Folktale Classification it is indexed as type SUS 363, . These stories are about a girl who marries a mysterious man. During their way home, they stop by a church and the man enters it. Worried about his long absence, the woman follows him and sees him devouring a corpse.

The original name of the tale, Упырь, is the word for "vampire" in Slavic languages.

Variants
Scholarship states that the tale type appears in Europe and Turkey. In Turkish variants, the heroine triumphs in the end over the dervish, while in Europe the fate of the heroine may differ between regions (a Scandinavian and Baltic version, a West Slavic and Ukrainian one).

References

External links
The original text, in Russian in Wikisource
 Project Gutenberg Russian Fairy Tales by Ralston, William Ralston Shedden, 1828-1889.
 Russian Fairy Tale Stories, Zeluna.net.

Russian fairy tales
ATU 300-399